Ministry of Fisheries, Animal Husbandry and Dairying is a newly formed ministry in India. It was formed in May 2019 by Modi government from the department of same name under fish minister

. The move was welcomed by Tamil Nadu Co-operative Milk Producers' Federation Limited (TNCMPF), the marketer of Aavin and Gujarat Cooperative Milk Marketing Federation (GCMMF), the marketer of Amul.

List of  Ministers

Ministers of State

See also
Department of Animal husbandry and Dairying
Animal Welfare Board of India

References

External links
 

Government ministries of India
Ministry_of_Fisheries,_Animal_Husbandry_and_Dairying